Valma Lorraine Batty (25 September 1928 – November 1995) was an Australian cricketer from Melbourne. Batty played seven Test matches for the Australia national women's cricket team.

References

1928 births
1995 deaths
Australia women Test cricketers
Cricketers from Melbourne
Sportswomen from Victoria (Australia)
Victoria women cricketers